Mohamad Jalal Kdouh (born 10 July 1997) is a Lebanese footballer who plays as a forward for Iraqi club Amanat Baghdad, on loan from  club Ahed, and the Lebanon national team. Mainly a striker, Kdouh can also play as a winger.

Coming through the youth system, Kdouh began his senior career at Ahed in 2013, winning multiple titles – most notably the 2019 AFC Cup. He was sent on loan abroad, to Bangladeshi side Bashundhara Kings in 2019, to Saudi Arabian side Al Jandal in 2020, and to Iraqi sides Amanat Baghdad and Al-Zawraa in 2021 and 2022.

Having represented Lebanon internationally at youth levels, Kdouh made his senior debut in the 2019 WAFF Championship, where he also scored his first goal.

Club career

Ahed 
Coming through the youth academy, Kdouh made his senior debut for Lebanese Premier League side Ahed in 2013. His first goal came during the 2016–17 season, which he ended with seven goals in 17 appearances. In the following season he scored five in 12. Kdouh equaled the previous season's league goal tally in the 2018–19 season, with two more games, and scored five goals along with two assists in the 2019 AFC Cup.

Loan to Bashundhara Kings 
On 19 September 2019, Bangladesh Premier League champions Bashundhara Kings announced the signing of Kdouh on a one-year loan. His first goal for the club came on 24 October 2019, scoring a brace against Chennai City in a 3–2 win in the group stage of the 2019 Sheikh Kamal International Club Cup. He scored once again the following game, against Terengganu, ending the tournament with three goals.

Kdouh scored two goals at the 2019–20 Bangladesh Federation Cup, to help his side win the title, the first in their history. He ended his stay with the Bangladeshi side with five goals in seven appearances without featuring in the league.

Loan to Al Jandal 
On 27 January 2020, Kdouh was sent on a three-month loan to Saudi Second Division side Al Jandal. Kdouh's first goal came on his debut, on 31 January 2020, in a 2–1 win over Al Suqoor. Kdouh ended the season with two goals and six assists in eight games; he played five games as a striker and three as a winger.

Return to Ahed 

Upon his return from loan to Ahed, Kdouh scored a hat-trick against Bourj in the first matchday of the 2020–21 season, on 4 October 2020, to help his side win 3–2. On 18 December, he scored a brace against Salam Zgharta in a 3–0 win. Kdouh scored seven goals and made one assist in 11 games in the first leg.

Loan to Amanat Baghdad 
On 11 January 2021, Kdouh joined Iraqi Premier League club Amanat Baghdad on a five-month loan, midway through the 2020–21 season. He made his debut on 5 February, in a 1–0 league defeat to Al-Najaf. Kdouh scored his first goal on 14 February, helping his team with 1–0 against Al-Karkh. He made his first assist on 24 February, in a 2–2 draw to Erbil. On 18 April, Kdouh scored a brace to help Amanat Baghdad win 2–1 against Al-Sinaat Al-Kahrabaiya. He finished his loan with seven goals in 15 league games.

Second return to Ahed 
Following his loan at Amanat Baghdad, Ahed announced that Kdouh would remain in their first-team squad for the 2021–22 season. Between September and October 2021, he scored five league goals in the opening four league games, including a brace against Sagesse. Kdouh finished the first leg of the season with six goals and two assists.

Loans to Al-Zawraa and Amanat Baghdad 
On 16 January 2022, Kdouh was loaned out to Al-Zawraa in the Iraqi Premier League for three months. His first goal came on 15 February, helping his side beat Al-Diwaniya 2–0 in the league. Kdouh asked for his contract to be terminated in April.

After not finding much space in Ahed's starting 11 during the 2022–23 season, due to the arrival of Scottish forward Lee Erwin, Kdouh was sent on loan to Iraqi club Amanat Baghdad for a second time on 29 January 2023 for the remainder of the season.

International career

Youth 

Kdouh represented the Lebanon under-19 team, playing two games at the 2016 AFC U-19 Championship qualification. He was called up to the under-23 team for the 2018 AFC U-23 Championship qualification, playing in all three games. Kdouh also served as captain in all three 2020 qualifications games, scoring against the Maldives in a 6–0 win.

Senior 
Kdouh made his debut for the senior team on 30 July 2019, in a 1–0 defeat against Iraq at the 2019 WAFF Championship. His first international goal came on 8 August 2019, scoring Lebanon's lone goal in a 2–1 defeat against Yemen in the same competition.

On 12 October 2021, Kdouh scored his first international brace, helping Lebanon beat Syria 3–2 in the third round of qualification for the 2022 FIFA World Cup. He was nominated Man of the Match, and Future Star of Matchday 4 for his performance.

Career statistics

International 

Scores and results list Lebanon's goal tally first, score column indicates score after each Kdouh goal.

Honours 
Ahed
 AFC Cup: 2019
 Lebanese Premier League: 2016–17, 2017–18, 2018–19, 2021–22
 Lebanese FA Cup: 2017–18, 2018–19
 Lebanese Elite Cup: 2022; runner-up: 2021
 Lebanese Super Cup: 2015, 2017, 2018, 2019

Bashundhara Kings
 Bangladesh Federation Cup: 2019–20

Individual
 Lebanese Premier League Best Young Player: 2015–16

References

External links

 
 
 
 
 

1997 births
Living people
People from Bint Jbeil District
Lebanese footballers
Association football forwards
Association football wingers
Al Ahed FC players
Bashundhara Kings players
Al Jandal Club players
Amanat Baghdad players
Al-Zawraa SC players
Lebanese Premier League players
Saudi Second Division players
Iraqi Premier League players
Lebanon youth international footballers
Lebanon international footballers
AFC Cup winning players
Lebanese expatriate footballers
Lebanese expatriate sportspeople in Bangladesh
Lebanese expatriate sportspeople in Saudi Arabia
Lebanese expatriate sportspeople in Iraq
Expatriate footballers in Bangladesh
Expatriate footballers in Saudi Arabia
Expatriate footballers in Iraq